Rizzo may refer to:

 Rizzo (band), an indie pop band from Los Angeles
 Rizzo (surname)
 Rizzo the Rat, a Muppet character
 Ratso Rizzo, Dustin Hoffman's character in Midnight Cowboy
 Betty Rizzo, Stockard Channing's character in Grease (film)
 Staff Sergeant Luther Wilson Rizzo, a character from the show M*A*S*H
 Anthony Rizzo, a Major League Baseball player
 Frank Rizzo, former mayor of Philadelphia

 Rizzo the mouse , an animal crossing character